Sämtisersee is a lake in the Alpstein range of the canton of Appenzell Innerrhoden, Switzerland. It is located below Hoher Kasten not far from Fälensee.

See also
List of mountain lakes of Switzerland

External links 

Images of Sämtisersee

Lakes of Switzerland
Lakes of Appenzell Innerrhoden